Kurvin Wallace (born 11 October 1971) is a retired Kittian sprinter who specialized in the 200 metres.

In the 100 metres he competed at the 1995 World Championships without reaching the final. He then reached the semi-final at the 1998 Central American and Caribbean Games and competed at the 2002 Commonwealth Games without reaching the final.

In the 200 metres, he competed at the 1995 Pan American Games and the 1995 World Championships without reaching the final. He then reached the semi-final at the 1998 Central American and Caribbean Games and competed at the 2002 Commonwealth Games without reaching the final.

In the 4 × 100 metres relay, he finished eighth at the 1995 Pan American Games and competed at the 1995 World Championships without reaching the final.

References

1971 births
Living people
Saint Kitts and Nevis male sprinters
World Athletics Championships athletes for Saint Kitts and Nevis
Pan American Games competitors for Saint Kitts and Nevis
Athletes (track and field) at the 1995 Pan American Games
Commonwealth Games competitors for Saint Kitts and Nevis
Athletes (track and field) at the 2002 Commonwealth Games